Robert Mermoud (born 25 September 1908) was a Swiss water polo player. He competed at the 1928 Summer Olympics and the 1936 Summer Olympics.

References

1908 births
Year of death missing
Swiss male water polo players
Olympic water polo players of Switzerland
Water polo players at the 1928 Summer Olympics
Water polo players at the 1936 Summer Olympics
Place of birth missing